Sol-Iletsk is a town in Orenburg Oblast, Russia, located on the right bank of the Ilek River (Ural's tributary),  south of Orenburg, the administrative center of the oblast. Population:    22,000 (1975); 11,802 (1897).

The climate is arid, sharply continental.

History

It was founded in the 17th century as a Cossack settlement. In the mid-18th century, it was renamed Iletskaya Zashchita due to the construction of fortifications. The name was then changed to Iletsk in the 19th century. In 1945, the town was given its present name. A thick bed of excellent rocksalt is worked near this town (hence, the word "" (sol) in the town's name, which means "salt" in Russian). The place is also known as a balneological resort for its mineral waters, salt, mud, and brine baths, and its kumis cures.

Administrative and municipal status
Within the framework of administrative divisions, Sol-Iletsk serves as the administrative center of Sol-Iletsky District, even though it is not a part of it. As an administrative division, it is incorporated separately as the Town of Sol-Iletsk—an administrative unit with the status equal to that of the districts. As a municipal division, the territories of the Town of Sol-Iletsk and of Sol-Iletsky District are incorporated as Sol-Iletsky Urban Okrug.

Penitentiary facilities
Sol-Iletsk houses what is commonly called the Black Dolphin Prison.

References

Notes

Sources

Cities and towns in Orenburg Oblast